Lie with Me is a British television crime drama series first broadcast on ITV from 15 to 16 November 2004. The two-part serial stars Andrew Lincoln and Eve Best as Will Tomlinson and Roselyn Tyler, a police officer and a victim drawn together during the course of a murder investigation. The serial received good viewing figures at the time of broadcast, but was critically panned, many blaming the poor ending as a reason for ITV not to renew it as an ongoing series. The DVD of the serial was released on 15 January 2007.

Plot
Drugged with GHB, Ros Tyler (Eve Best) has no recollection of her weekend activities. When she awakens, however, she discovers that she has been raped, and her roommate has been murdered. Will (Andrew Lincoln) is assigned to the case as Lead Investigator. When Will and Ros slowly find attraction to one another - she for the security and he for the frailty - their desire for justice, and vindication, leads them towards a difficult and illegal action.

Cast
 Andrew Lincoln as DI Will Tomlinson
 Eve Best as Roselyn Tyler
 Inday Ba as Ms. Reed
 Paul McGann as Gerry Henson
 Amanda Mealing as Carolyn Henson
 Bill Paterson as DCI Collman
 Mark Lewis Jones as Paul Stebbings
 Anthony Flanagan as Tom Fraser
 Josephine Butler as Donna Grogan

Episode list

References

External links

ITV television dramas
2004 British television series debuts
2004 British television series endings
2000s British drama television series
Television shows produced by Granada Television
Television series by ITV Studios
Television shows set in London
2000s British television miniseries
English-language television shows
Films directed by Susanna White